Dimapur District (Pron:/ˌdɪməˈpʊə/) is a district of Nagaland state in India.

History

Assam lease Dimapur to Nagaland
In 1918, Dimapur was leased to then Naga Hills District (Now Nagaland) by then erstwhile Assam Province of British India for 30 years for construction of Railways lines (unclear from which district). In 1963, It was again leased to now state of Nagaland for 99 years. Though, there is refute of this claim, as both state government has not come forward to comment on the matter. 

Administration

Divisions 
 Ao Yimküm
 Aoyimti
 Bamunpukhuri
 Darogajan
 Darogapathar
 Dimapur Municipality
 Ekranipathar
 Eralibill
 Indisen
 Khusiabill
 Kuda
 Naharbari
 Padumpukhuri
 Phaipijang
 Phevima
 Purana Bazar
 Rilan
 Samaguri
 Sangtamtilla
 Senjüm
 Shozukhü
 Signal Angami
 Thahekhü
 Toluvi
 Zani

Demographics
According to the 2011 census Dimapur district has a population of 378,811, roughly equal to the nation of Maldives.  This gives it a ranking of 563rd in India (out of a total of 640). Its population growth rate over the decade 2001–2011 was 0%. Dimapur has a sex ratio of 916 females for every 1000 males, and a literacy rate of 85.44%.

Religion 

According to the 2011 official census, Christianity is major religion in Dimapur district, with 234.239 Christians (61.84%), 108.900 Hindus (28.75%), 31.212 Muslims (8.24%), 2.148 Jains (0.57%), 1.270 Buddhists (0.34%), 567 Sikhs (0.15%), 157 did others (0.04%) and 319 did not stated (0.08%).

Education

The district has ample number of institutions devoted for providing quality education to the residents. Most schools have English as their medium of instruction and are affiliated to the Nagaland Board of School Education.

Sports
Dimapur is also home to Dimapur United a soccer club which plays in  Nagaland Premier League. Most schools in Dimapur held friendly football matches and tournaments. Apart from football, many other games are also played in the district. Cricket, Badminton, Wrestling and Angling are other sports played in Dimapur.

References

External links

 Official site

 
Districts of Nagaland
1997 establishments in Nagaland